Poliosia fragilis is a moth in the family Erebidae. It was described by Thomas Pennington Lucas in 1890. It is found in Queensland, Australia.

References

Moths described in 1890
Lithosiina